Olaug Nilssen (born 28 December 1977) is a Norwegian novelist, playwright, children's writer, essayist and magazine editor.

Personal life
Nilssen was born in Førde on 28 December 1977.

Career
Among Nilssen's early novels are Innestengt i udyr from 1998 and Vi har så korte armar from 2002. Her novel Få meg på, for faen from 2005 was adapted for theatre, and was also basis for the 2011 film  Turn Me On, Dammit!, directed by Jannicke Systad Jacobsen. The film received the Screenplay award at the 2011 Tribeca Film Festival. Among her plays are Skyfri himmel, which was staged at Rogaland Teater in 2006, and Stort og stygt from 2013.

Her novel Tung tids tale from 2017 earned her the Brage Prize. She was awarded the Dobloug Prize in 2019.

References

1977 births
Living people
People from Førde
20th-century Norwegian novelists
21st-century Norwegian novelists
Norwegian dramatists and playwrights
Norwegian essayists
Norwegian children's writers
Norwegian magazine editors
20th-century essayists
21st-century essayists
Dobloug Prize winners